Grogan is a surname. The Irish version is Ó Gruagáin.

List of persons
Notable people with the surname include:

 Benjamin Grogan, FBI agent killed in the 1986 FBI Miami shootout
 Clare Grogan (born 1962), Scottish actress and singer
 Clem Grogan (born 1951), real name Steve Dennis Grogan, an American murderer and former member of the Manson Family
 Cornelius Grogan (1738?–1798), a member of the Society of United Irishmen
 David Grogan (1914–1993), British water polo player
 Edward Grogan (disambiguation), several people
 Emmett Grogan (1943–1978), founder of the hippie group the Diggers
 Ewart Grogan (1874–1967), British explorer of Africa, Kenyan businessman
 George Grogan (1875–1962), British Army officer, recipient of the Victoria Cross
 Ione Grogan (1891–1961), American academic and educator
 James Grogan (1931–2000), American figure skater
 Janet Grogan, Irish singer and songwriter
 John Grogan (born 1957), American journalist
 John Grogan (disambiguation), several people
 Kevin Grogan (born 1981), Irish football player
 Liz Grogan, Canadian television host
 Nathaniel Grogan (1740–1807), Irish illustrator
 Raymond G. Grogan (1920–2016), American phytopathologist
 Steve Grogan (born 1953), American football player
 Grogan, a ring name of Matthew Waters (born 1985), American professional wrestler

Fictional characters
 Grogan family (John, Jenny, Patrick, Connor, Colleen, Marley) from the 2008 U.S. dramedy film Marley & Me (film)
 Ally Grogan, fictional character from 2012 from the British soap opera Hollyoaks
 Damien Grogan, fictional character from 2016 from the Australian soap opera Home and Away
 Little Mickey Grogan, titular character from the eponymous 1927 U.S. comedy film
 Smiler Grogan, fictional ex-con played by Jimmy Durante from the 1963 U.S. comedy film It's a Mad, Mad, Mad, Mad World
 Tom Grogan, titular character, a side character from the eponymous best-selling 1896 U.S. novel by Francis Hopkinson Smith

See also
 Nan Grogan Orrock, American politician

Surnames of Irish origin